Hossein Ali Beg Bayat was a Safavid diplomat from the Turkoman Bayat clan, who served as the ambassador to the Holy Roman Empire, the Russian Tsardom, Habsburg Spain and several other royal and noble courts during the reign of king Abbas I (r. 1588–1628), and was part of the first Safavid embassy to Europe.

Biography
When king Abbas I decided to send Sir Anthony Shirley on an important diplomatic mission in Europe, in order to gain support and to form an alliance against the common cause, the Ottoman enemy, Anthony asked the king to send with him an Iranian of rank. Abbas chose a Qizilbash noble, Hossein Ali Beg, and, according to historian David Blow, he seems to have made him the official leader of the mission. However, this matter was apparently never made clear to Sir Anthony or he simply refused to accept it. This would be the reason for a constant unpleasant atmosphere that would sometimes culminate in bitter disputes between the two over precedence. Sir Robert Shirley, who was Abbas' initial choice instead of his brother Sir Anthony, stayed in Iran to train the army. Hossein Ali Beg and Anthony were accompanied by three others, including Hossein Ali Beg's nephew Ali Qoli Beg, Uruch Beg (later Don Juan), nineteen members of Sir Anthony's original suite, as well as two Portuguese friars. Hossein Ali Beg additionally took a number of Iranian secretaries and servants with him. The entourage left the Safavid capital of Isfahan on 9 July 1599. After reaching Astrakhan, they spent the winter at the Russian court in Moscow. There, Hossein Ali Beg and Sir Anthony quarreled over who should have precedence, but Tsar Boris Godunov chose Hossein Ali Beg's side and even imprisoned Sir Anthony for some time after the Portuguese friar, Nicoloa de Melo made certain accusations against him. In the spring of 1600, Hossein Ali Beg and his retinue left Moscow, and after several stops at various German courts, they eventually arrived in the capital of the Holy Roman Empire, Prague in the autumn of 1600. There, where they were lavishly received, emperor Rudolph II who was already at war with the Ottomans, vowed to pursue the war against them with "great vigour". After a long stay in Prague, they left for Bavaria, Mantua, and Florence where they were received by the Medicis.

Relations between Hossein Ali Beg and Anthony Shirley at this time drastically worsened. In Siena, there was a heavy altercation between the two over the missing presents (for the kings and nobles), with Hossein Ali Beg calling Sir Anthony a thief. On 5 April 1601 the two entered Rome and were greeted with salutes from the Castel Sant' Angelo, but the two were constantly engaged in a heavy argue over once again precedence, which became so heated that they started lashing out at each other. Due to the conflict, their audience with Pope Clement VIII was delayed. At the end of May of the same year, the two parted. Anthony Shirley left initially for Venice, and later ended his days in Madrid as a pensioner of the king of Spain. Hossein Ali Beg had a different fate, for three members of his group were converted to Catholicism and left the mission as well. After this happening, which greatly upset him, he continued the journey with the remainder of the group, and was well received by the Spanish court in Valladolid. At the court, he raised an issue which caused some friction, namely regarding the alleged ill treatment of Iranian merchants by the Portuguese authorities on the island of Hormuz. Now that Portugal and Spain were united under one crown, this was also a Spanish matter. King Philip III promised to address the issue and assured that he would continue to fight against the Ottomans with all the means at his disposal. Hossein Ali Beg encountered further issues regarding his group, as the three principal members of his suite, which included his nephew Ali Qoli Beg, were converted by the Jesuits and also become Catholics. His nephew Ali Qoli Beg and Uruch Beg were baptised as Don Philip and Don Juan in the Chapel Royal, with the Spanish King and Queen as sponsors. Hossein Ali Beg, deeply chagrined and unable to do anything, sailed back for Iran from Lisbon in 1602. Hossein Ali Beg and his entourage had also initially made plans to meet with the courts of France, England, Scotland and Poland, but they were abandoned on the way.

See also
Mehdi Qoli Beg
 Habsburg-Persian alliance

References

Sources
 
 
 

16th-century Iranian politicians
17th-century Iranian politicians
17th-century deaths
Ambassadors of Safavid Iran to the Tsardom of Russia
Ambassadors of Safavid Iran to the Holy Roman Empire
Ambassadors of Safavid Iran to Spain
Ambassadors of Safavid Iran to the Grand Duchy of Turscany
16th-century people of Safavid Iran
Iranian Turkmen people
17th-century people of Safavid Iran
16th-century diplomats
17th-century diplomats